Wycombe District Council in Buckinghamshire, England was elected every four years from 1973 until 2020. Since the last boundary changes in 2003, 60 councillors were elected from 28 wards.

Political control
From the first election to the council in 1973 until its merger into Buckinghamshire Council in 2020, political control of the council was held by the following parties:

Leadership
The leaders of the council from 1999 until its abolition in 2020 were:

Council elections
1973 Wycombe District Council election
1976 Wycombe District Council election
1979 Wycombe District Council election
1983 Wycombe District Council election (New ward boundaries)
1987 Wycombe District Council election (District boundary changes took place but the number of seats remained the same)
1991 Wycombe District Council election (District boundary changes took place but the number of seats remained the same)
1995 Wycombe District Council election
1999 Wycombe District Council election
2003 Wycombe District Council election (New ward boundaries)
2007 Wycombe District Council election
2011 Wycombe District Council election
2015 Wycombe District Council election

By-election results

1993-1999

1999-2003

2003-2007

2007-2011

References

By-election results

External links
Wycombe District Council

 
Council elections in Buckinghamshire
District council elections in England